Russian trolls may refer to:

 Internet Research Agency, a Russian company engaged in online influence operations
 Russian web brigades, Russian state-sponsored Internet commentators